Berry Brook flows into Beaver Kill by Beaverkill, New York.

References

Rivers of New York (state)
Rivers of Sullivan County, New York
Rivers of Delaware County, New York
Tributaries of the East Branch Delaware River